Community Dentistry and Oral Epidemiology is a bimonthly peer-reviewed medical journal covering dental public health and the application of epidemiology to dentistry. It was established in 1973 and is published by John Wiley & Sons. The editor-in-chief is Professor Sarah R Baker (University of Sheffield, UK). According to the Journal Citation Reports, the journal has a 2020 impact factor of 3.383, ranking it 26th out of 91 journals in the category "Dentistry, Oral Surgery & Medicine" and 69th out of 203 in the category "Public, Environmental & Occupational Health".

References

External links

Dentistry journals
Epidemiology journals
Public health journals
Publications established in 1973
Bimonthly journals
Wiley (publisher) academic journals
English-language journals